M. N. Goiporia was an Indian career banker who served as the fourteenth Chairman of State Bank of India.

Career

Early career 

He had joined the State Bank of India as a probationary officer and served in a number of roles until finally becoming the Chairman of State Bank of India in 1990.

Banking career 

He served as the fourteenth Chairman of State Bank of India from 19 February 1990 until 31 July 1992.

As a fallout of the 1992 Indian stock market scam, M. N. Goiporia was asked by the Indian government to step down from his role as Chairman of State Bank of India and was soon replaced by Dipankar Basu as the new Chairman of State Bank of India.

Goiporia Committee 

He served as the chairman of the Goiporia Committee, which made several important recommendations to improve the level of customer service in Indian banks. As a result of the Goiporia Committee recommendations, all Indian banks are required to maintain a customer complaint book with adequate pages for recording customer complaints.

Legacy 

Today, he is largely remembered for his role in 1992 Indian stock market scam. State Bank of India too was involved in the scam and several allegations were made against M. N. Goiporia, who was the then chairman.

In Scam 1992: The Harshad Mehta Story , a documentary film chronicling the 1992 Indian stock market scam, the role of M. N. Goiporia was played by the Indian actor Vivek Vaswani.

References

External links 

 Official Biography
 SBI chairmen
 SBI history

Indian bankers
State Bank of India
Chairmen of the State Bank of India
Indian corporate directors
Living people
Year of birth missing (living people)